The third USS Los Angeles (CA-135) was a , laid down by the Philadelphia Navy Yard, Philadelphia, on 28 July 1943 and launched on 20 August 1944. She was sponsored by Mrs. Fletcher Bowron and commissioned on 22 July 1945, with Captain John A. Snackenberg in command.

Service history

1944–1948
After a shakedown cruise out of Guantánamo Bay, Cuba, Los Angeles sailed on 15 October for the Far East via the west coast and arrived at Shanghai, China, on 3 January 1946. During the next year she operated with the 7th Fleet along the coast of China and in the western Pacific to the Marianas. She returned to San Francisco, California, on 21 January 1947, and was decommissioned at Hunters Point on 9 April 1948, and entered the Pacific Reserve Fleet.

1951–1953
Los Angeles was recommissioned on 27 January 1951, Capt. Robert N. McFarlane in command. In response to the American efforts in the Korean War, she sailed for the Far East 14 May and joined naval operations off the eastern coast of Korea on 31 May as flagship for Rear Admiral Arleigh A. Burke's CRUDIV 5. During the next six months she ranged the coastal waters of the Korean Peninsula from Hungnam in the east to Haeju in the west while her guns pounded enemy coastal positions. After returning to the United States on 17 December for overhaul and training, she made her second deployment to Korean waters on 9 October 1952 and participated on 11 October in a concentrated shelling of enemy bunkers and observation points at Koji-ni. During the next few months, she continued to provide off-shore gunfire support for American ground operations, and cruised the Sea of Japan with fast carriers of the 7th Fleet. While participating in the bombardment of Wonsan late in March and early in April 1953, she received minor damage from enemy shore batteries, but continued operations until sailing for the west coast in mid-April. She arrived at Long Beach on 15 May.

1953–1963
Between November 1953 and June 1963 Los Angeles made eight more deployments to the Far East where she served as a cruiser division flagship with the 7th Fleet in support of "keeping the peace" operations in that troubled part of the world. Her operations sent her from the coast of Japan to the Sea of Japan, the Yellow Sea, and the East and South China Seas; and with units of the 7th Fleet she steamed to American bases in the Philippines and Okinawa, as well as to Allied bases in South Korea, Hong Kong, Australia, and Taiwan. During the Quemoy-Matsu crisis in 1956, she patrolled the Taiwan Strait to help protect ROC Army units from possible landing offenses from Communist China. When not deployed in the western Pacific, Los Angeles operated out of Long Beach along the west coast and in the Pacific to the Hawaiian Islands. She returned to Long Beach from her final Far East deployment on 20 June 1963.

Decommissioning and sale
While some consideration was made to convert Los Angeles into a single-end Talos missile cruiser, with flagship facilities (in essence a heavy cruiser version of the Oklahoma City) funds were not appropriated for this or for a general overhaul to enable her continued fleet service, so she was decommissioned at Long Beach on 15 November 1963 and entered the Pacific Reserve Fleet at San Diego. Stricken on 1 January 1974, and sold on 16 May 1975 (sale #16-5049) to the National Steel Corporation for $1,864,380.21, and scrapped in San Pedro, California.

The flying bridge and a small portion of the bow section of the Los Angeles is on display at the Los Angeles Maritime Museum in San Pedro, CA.

In popular culture
 USS Los Angeles was featured in The Adventures of Tintin comic The Red Sea Sharks by Hergé. She is shown patrolling in the Red Sea and is involved in the rescue of Tintin and his friends from a post-war Type II U-boat operated by slave traders.
 In a scene (approximately 47:40–53:00) from the 1977 film MacArthur depicting a Pearl Harbor shipboard strategy meeting between President Roosevelt, Nimitz, and MacArthur, a painting of the USS Los Angeles is clearly seen on the bulkhead.

Awards 
Occupation Germany/Japan
Asiatic–Pacific Campaign Medal
World War II Victory Medal
China Service Medal *2 Jan – 30 Aug 46
National Defense Service Medal with star
Korean Service Medal with 5 battle stars 
Armed Forces Expeditionary Medal with 2battle stars
United Nations Korea Medal
Korean Presidential Unit Citation

References

External links

 
 USS Los Angeles site

 

Baltimore-class cruisers
Korean War cruisers of the United States
Cold War cruisers of the United States
Ships built in Philadelphia
1944 ships
San Pedro, Los Angeles